The 2020–21 Canberra United FC season was the club's thirteenth season in the W-League, the premier competition for women's football. The team played home games at Viking Park. The club's manager for the season was new appointment Vicki Linton.

The season covered the period from 29 December 2020 to 11 April 2021.

Transfers

Transfers in

Transfers out

W-League

League table

Results summary

Results by matchday

Matches 

On 30 November 2020, the W-League fixtures were announced.

Finals series

Players

Squad information

Squad Statistics

Appearances and goals 

|-
! colspan=14 style=background:#dcdcdc; text-align:center| Goalkeepers

|-
! colspan=14 style=background:#dcdcdc; text-align:center| Defenders

|-
! colspan=14 style=background:#dcdcdc; text-align:center| Midfielders

|-
! colspan=14 style=background:#dcdcdc; text-align:center| Forwards

Goalscorers 
{| class="wikitable" style="text-align:center;"
|-
!"width:35px;"|
!"width:35px;"|
!"width:35px;"|
!"width:200px;"|Player
!"width:75px;"| W-League
|-
|rowspan=1| 1 || FW || 23 || align=left|  || 10
|-
|rowspan=1| 2 || FW || 19 || align=left|  || 4
|-
|rowspan=1| 3 || MF || 10 || align=left|  || 2
|-
|rowspan=4| 4 || MF || 8 || align=left|  || 1
|-
| FW || 13 || align=left|  || 1
|-
| MF || 6 || align=left|  || 1
|-
| FW || 12 || align=left|  || 1
|-
!colspan="4"|Total || 20
|-

Assists 
{| class="wikitable" style="text-align:center;"
|-
!"width:35px;"|
!"width:35px;"|
!"width:35px;"|
!"width:200px;"|Player
!"width:75px;"| W-League
|-
|rowspan=1| 1 || FW || 23 || align=left|  || 3
|-
|rowspan=3| 2 || MF || 8 || align=left|  || 2
|-
| MF || 10 || align=left|  || 2
|-
| DF || 5 || align=left|  || 2
|-
|rowspan=7| 3 || DF || 15 || align=left|  || 1
|-
| FW || 19 || align=left|  || 1
|-
| FW || 9 || align=left|  || 1
|-
| MF || 6 || align=left|  || 1
|-
| FW || 12 || align=left|  || 1
|-
| MF || 19 || align=left|  || 1
|-
| MF || 7 || align=left|  || 1
|-
!colspan="4"|Total || 20
|-

Disciplinary record 
{|class="wikitable" style="text-align: center;"
|-
!rowspan="2" style="width:50px;"|Rank
!rowspan="2" style="width:50px;"|Position
!rowspan="2" style="width:180px;"|Name
!colspan="2"|W-League
|-
!style="width:30px;"|
!style="width:30px;"|
|-
|rowspan=1| 1 || MF ||align=left| Laura Hughes

| 3 || 0
|-
|rowspan=1| 2 || DF ||align=left| Jessikah Nash

| 2 || 0
|-
|rowspan=3| 3 || FW ||align=left| Nickoletta Flannery

| 1 || 0
|-
| MF ||align=left| Demi Koulizakis

| 1 || 0
|-
| MF ||align=left| Ieva Bidermane

| 1 || 0
|-
!colspan=3|Total!!8!!0

References

External links 

 Official Website

Canberra United FC seasons